Until the Voices Fade... is an EP released by The Crüxshadows in 1999 as a lead up to The Mystery of the Whisper. The song "Here Comes the Rain Again" is a Eurythmics cover.

Track listing

The Crüxshadows EPs
1999 EPs